The Diplomatic Academy of the Ministry of Foreign Affairs of the Russian Federation is among the oldest diplomatic institutes in the world, which trains specialists in the field of international relations, international economic relations and international law.

The Diplomatic Academy is an educational institution founded by the Ministry of Foreign Affairs of the Russian Federation. Besides the higher professional education programs, the Diplomatic Academy implements additional education programs. The main ones are the programs of retraining and advanced training of diplomatic workers in Russia and foreign countries.

History 
The Diplomatic Academy was founded in 1934. The Institute began to work in the building of the former rental house of the First Russian Insurance Society, which the PCFA (since 1946 - MFA) occupied from 1918 to 1952. In 1974, by the decision of the USSR Council of Ministers, the Higher Diplomatic School was transformed into the Diplomatic Academy of the USSR Ministry of Foreign Affairs. Over the years the Academy has graduated over 7 thousand professional diplomats, among whom over 500 people have received the rank of Extraordinary and Plenipotentiary Ambassador .

The Diplomatic Academy of the Ministry of Foreign Affairs of Russia is an elite educational institution that is one of the most well-known and prestigious centers for training and retraining of specialists in the field of international relations, economics, political science, and law. Students are trained to work at the Ministry of Foreign Affairs of Russia, foreign countries and the CIS countries. Today, representatives from about 30 countries of the world study at the Academy.

Traditionally, the Diplomatic Academy is famous for its unique, highly effective methods of intensive foreign languages teaching. More than 20 foreign languages are taught at the Academy.

Faculty and alumni
At the present, the Diplomatic Academy is one of the most prestigious educational institutions in Russia. Individuals assigned to high ranking positions in foreign service such as ambassadors, counselors, envoys, consuls general, and representatives at international organizations are trained at the academy. Well known diplomats and political office holders such as Anatoly Aksakov, Yashar Aliyev, Elmar Mammadyarov, Yuri Baturin, Vitaly Churkin, Anatoly Dobrynin, Vladimir Grinin, Zamir Kabulov, Konstantin Kharchev, Igor Korchilov, Sergei Lebedev, Valentina Matviyenko, Yuri Merzlyakov, Shalva Natelashvili, Ilhom Nematov, Nikolai Kuryanovich, Sergei Ordzhonikidze, Grigol Vashadze, Alexander Veshnyakov, Leonid Zamyatin, Tahira Tahirova, and Yuri Brezhnev are among the academy alumni.

The academy is home to 170 highly qualified professors, 39 of whom are doctors of sciences, 55 - associate professors and candidates of sciences (PhD), and 48 - researchers. Employees of the institute can be employed in the diplomatic ranks of the MFA: among them 11 Ambassadors Extraordinary and Plenipotentiary, and 11 Honored Scientists. Guest-lecturers of the academy include senior officers of the Russian Ministry for Foreign Affairs, well-known politicians, and high-ranking foreign officials (presidents, prime-ministers, foreign ministers, ambassadors).

Since 2009 the dean of the academy has been Igor Panarin.

The academy now provides various educational programs: Bachelor degree programs with concentration on International Relations, Economics, Law; Master degree programs in Economics, Management, International Relations, Law; Post-graduate educational programs with concentration on Political sciences and regional studies, Economics, History sciences and archeology, Law.

The students of the Diplomatic Academy are able to study two or more languages at the same time, and can choose from Oriental languages, German and French languages, Slavic languages, Roman languages.

Partnership agreements
Long-standing cooperations exist with other comparable institutions such as the Diplomatic Academy of Vienna and MGIMO.

See also
Ministry of Foreign Affairs (Russia)
Foreign relations of Russia

References

External links
 official website of the Diplomatic Academy of the Ministry of Foreign Affairs of the Russian Federation.  
 Swiss Universities Handbook Information about Diplomatic Academy of the Ministry of Foreign Affairs of the Russian Federation.

Foreign relations of Russia
Diplomatic Academy of the Ministry of Foreign Affairs of the Russian Federation
Universities and colleges in the Soviet Union
Foreign relations of the Soviet Union
Schools of international relations
Diplomatic training